The women's 800 metres event at the 1991 Summer Universiade was held at the Don Valley Stadium in Sheffield on 20, 21 and 22 July 1991.

Medalists

Results

Heats

Semifinals

Final

References

Athletics at the 1991 Summer Universiade
1991